Current day Zangla village has no monastery, only a nunnery. Zangla Palace is sometimes called Zangla Monastery due to a mistake  probably first made by Tivadar Duka, biographer of Alexander Csoma de Kőrös, and later by Ervin Baktay, an Indologist who visited Zangla in 1928 to identify the locations related to Alexander Csoma de Kőrös. Suffering from malaria, he described Zangla Palace - probably due to the shrine and the monks living there - as a monastery.
Tsazar Monastery is a Buddhist monastery in the village of Tsa-zar, 6 kilometres from Zangla, Zanskar, Kargil district, Ladakh, northern India, formerly part of the Zangla Kingdom.

Tsazar Monastery is home to a small number of lamas and has some notable wall paintings.

Hungarian philologist Sándor Kőrösi Csoma edited the first Tibetan-English dictionary while living at Zangla Palace in 1823. The dictionary was published in 1824.

References

Buddhist monasteries in Ladakh
Tibetan Buddhist monasteries and temples in India